John Christopher Sturmius (1635–1703) was a 17th-century German mathematician.

Life 

He was born at Hippolstein in 1635.

He died in Altdorf in 1703.

Career 

He was a professor of philosophy and mathematics at Altdorf.

In 1670, he translated the works of Archimedes into German.

Bibliography 

His notable works include:

 Mathesis Juvenilis
 Physica Modernae Compendium
 Praelectiones Academicae
 Collegium Experimentale Curiosum

Sources 

His life and times have been described by many authors in their books. These include:

 A philosophical and mathematical dictionary by Charles Hutton
 The Biographical Treasury by Samuel Maunder
 John Gorton's General Biographical Dictionary
 Alexander Chalmers' General Biographical Dictionary

References

External links

1635 births
1703 deaths
17th-century German mathematicians
17th-century translators